Lyons is a suburb in the Canberra, Australia district of Woden. The postcode is 2606.

The suburb was named after Joseph Lyons, Labor Premier of Tasmania from 1923 to 1928 and a Minister in the James Scullin government from 1929 until his resignation from the Labor Party in March 1931. He subsequently led the United Australia Party and was the tenth Prime Minister of Australia from January 1932 until his death in 1939.

The suburb is bounded by Melrose Drive, Tuggeranong Parkway and Hindmarsh Drive. Oakey Hill Nature Reserve, part of Canberra Nature Park, is located within the suburb. The reserve has a number of walking trails and views across Woden and Weston Creek and into Civic. The suburb has a local shopping centre and neighbourhood oval. A former petrol station has since been demolished. Lyons Early Learning School caters for children from birth to grade two through an on-site childcare provider amalgamated with the school.

Streets in Lyons are named after locations in Tasmania.

Geology

Deakin Volcanics green-grey and purple rhyodacite in the west strip along Hindmarsh Drive and on Oakey Hill. Deakin Volcanics purple and green tuff in south east and north west. Deakin Volcanics Pink and green rhyodacitic porphyry is in the west on the higher parts. Yarralumla Formation calcareous shale is in the centre and along Devonport Street and in the north east. Mount Painter Volcanics cream rhyolite in the mid north. In Lyons it is evident that the Deakin Volcanics are laid on top of the Yarralumla Formation, which in turn overlies the Mount Painter Volcanics. A fault running east west shows itself as a line of quartz on the surface of the ground. An anticline heads in a north-south orientation through the east of the suburb. The Deakin acid Volcanics can be observed in cuttings along Tuggeranong Parkway, and Devonport Street.

Churches
 Immanuel Community Church
 Lyons Church of Christ
 St Alban's Anglican Church

Education
Lyons residents get preference for:
Lyons Early Childhood School
A shared Priority Enrollment Area (PEA) of Curtin Primary and Hughes Primary
Alfred Deakin High School
Canberra College

References

Suburbs of Canberra